The Boston mayoral election of 1963 occurred on Tuesday, November 5, 1963, between Mayor of Boston John F. Collins and Boston City Council member Gabriel Piemonte. Collins was elected to his second term.

The nonpartisan municipal preliminary election was held on September 24, 1963.

Candidates
John F. Collins, Mayor of Boston since 1960. Member of the Boston City Council from 1956 to 1957, member of the Massachusetts Senate from 1951 to 1955.
Gabriel Piemonte, member of the Boston City Council from 1952 to 1959 and since 1962.

Candidates eliminated in preliminary
Julius Ansel, member of the Massachusetts House of Representatives since 1959 and from 1953 to 1955. Member of the Boston City Council from 1948 to 1951.
William P. Foley, Boston environmental health inspector
Patrick F. McDonough, member of the Boston City Council since 1956.

Results

See also
List of mayors of Boston, Massachusetts

References

Boston mayoral
Boston
Mayoral elections in Boston
Non-partisan elections
1960s in Boston